Botrucnidifer is a genus of cnidarians belonging to the family Botrucnidiferidae.

The species of this genus are found in Europe and Africa.

Species:

Botrucnidifer norvegicus 
Botrucnidifer shtokmani

References

Botrucnidiferidae
Anthozoa genera